Pierre Maudru (1892–1992) was a French screenwriter. He also directed three films. He was the son of the silent era director Charles Maudru.

Selected filmography
 André Cornélis (1927)
 La Maison de la Fléche (1930)
 Hai-Tang (1930)
 Atlantis (1930)
 The Mystery of the Villa Rose (1930)
 The Sweetness of Loving (1930)
 The Polish Jew (1931)
 Our Lord's Vineyard (1932)
 Love and Luck (1932)
 Night Shift (1932)
 The Lacquered Box (1932)
 Miss Helyett (1933)
 The Barber of Seville (1933)
 The Flame (1936)
 The Porter from Maxim's (1939)
 Monsieur Hector (1940)
 Tourments (1954)
 The Contessa's Secret (1954)
 Marie of the Isles (1959)
 Hot Frustrations (1965)

References

Bibliography
 Goble, Alan. The Complete Index to Literary Sources in Film. Walter de Gruyter, 1999.

External links

1892 births
1992 deaths
20th-century French screenwriters
French film directors